Chiang Hung-chieh (born 22 February 1989) is a Taiwanese table tennis player. He competed at the 2016 Summer Olympics as part of the Taiwan's team in the men's team event. He married Japanese table tennis player Ai Fukuhara following the Rio Olympics. In March 2021, Ai and Chiang were reported to have filed for divorce. The couple jointly announced their divorce in July 2021.

References

1989 births
Living people
Taiwanese male table tennis players
Taiwanese people of Hakka descent
Olympic table tennis players of Taiwan
Table tennis players at the 2016 Summer Olympics
People from Hsinchu
Universiade medalists in table tennis
Asian Games medalists in table tennis
Table tennis players at the 2014 Asian Games
Asian Games bronze medalists for Chinese Taipei
Medalists at the 2014 Asian Games
Taiwanese expatriate sportspeople in Japan
Universiade silver medalists for Chinese Taipei
Expatriate table tennis people in Japan
Medalists at the 2007 Summer Universiade
Medalists at the 2013 Summer Universiade
Medalists at the 2015 Summer Universiade
Medalists at the 2017 Summer Universiade
21st-century Taiwanese people